The Indian National Congress (Organisation) also known as Congress (O) or Syndicate/Old Congress was a political party in India formed when the Congress party split following the expulsion of Indira Gandhi.

On 12 November 1969, the Prime Minister of India Indira Gandhi was expelled from the Congress party for violating the party discipline. The party finally split with Indira Gandhi setting up a rival organization Indian National Congress (Requisitionists), which came to be known as Congress (R) or Indicate/New Congress. In the All India Congress Committee, 446 of its 705 members walked over to Indira's side. K Kamaraj and later Morarji Desai were the leaders of the INC(O).

INC(O) led governments in Bihar under Bhola Paswan Shastri, Karnataka under Veerendra Patil, and in Gujarat under Hitendra K Desai. It was also a part of the Janata Morcha that ruled Gujarat under Babubhai J. Patel from 1975–1976 during the emergency era.

The split can in some ways be seen as a left-wing/right-wing division. Indira wanted to use a populist agenda in order to mobilize popular support for the party. The regional party elites, who formed the INC(O), stood for a more right-wing agenda, and distrusted Soviet help.

In the 1971 general election, the INC(O) won about 10% of the vote and 16 Lok Sabha seats, against 44% of the vote and 352 seats for Indira's Congress. In March 1977, the party fought the post-Emergency election under the banner of Janata Party.

The Janata Party alliance inflicted crushing defeat to Indira's Congress Party. Nevertheless, the total vote share of Congress (O) in 1977 was almost halved from 1971 and they lost three seats.. Later the same year, INC(O) formally merged with the Bharatiya Lok Dal, Bharatiya Jan Sangh, Socialist Party of India, Swatantra Party and others to form the Janata Party. Congress (O)'s leader Morarji Desai served as the fourth Prime Minister of India from 1977 to 1979 which was India's first non-Congress government.

Leaders 
 K. Kamaraj
 Morarji Desai
 S. Nijalingappa
 C. M. Poonacha
 Neelam Sanjiva Reddy
 Atulya Ghosh
 S. K. Patil
 Hitendra K Desai
 Satyendra Narayan Sinha
 Chandra Bhanu Gupta
 Veerendra Patil
 Ashoka Mehta
 Tribhuvan Narain Singh
 Ram Subhag Singh
 B. D. Sharma

See also 
Indian National Congress breakaway parties
Indian National Congress
Bharatiya Janata Party
All India Trinamool Congress
Aam Aadmi Party

Notes

Indian National Congress
Defunct political parties in India
Political parties established in 1969
Political parties disestablished in 1977
Conservative parties in India
Indian National Congress (Organisation)
Indian National Congress breakaway groups